This article lists U.S. men's college basketball national player of the year awards. Several organizations sponsor an award for the nation's top player. Twenty-six times since there’s been six player of the year awards, has a single player won each award. These players are considered the consensus national player of the year.

Trophies

List of honorees

Defunct awards

References